Paul Sand (born March 5, 1932) is an American actor and comedian.

Background
Sand was born Pablo Sanchez in Santa Monica, California, in 1932, the son of Ernest Rivera Sanchez, an aerospace tool designer, and Sonia Borodiansky (aka Sonia Stone), a writer. He is of Russian Jewish and Mexican American ancestry.

Career
At the age of 11, he started at Viola Spolin's Children's Theatre Company. From here, he attended Los Angeles State College before moving to Paris when he was 18. In Paris, Sand met Marcel Marceau, who was so impressed by his talents that he asked Sand to join his touring mime troupe.

In 1960, along with Alan Arkin and others, Sand was a cast member of The Second City improvisational comedy troupe in Chicago.  In 1966, he co-starred with Linda Lavin and Jo Anne Worley in the off-Broadway production The Mad Show, inspired by Mad Magazine. 

In 1971, Sand received a Tony Award for Best Performance by a Featured Actor in a Play for his work on Broadway in Paul Sills' Story Theatre and two Drama Desk Awards for Outstanding Performances on Broadway in Story Theatre and Metamorphosis. One of Sand's fellow cast members in Story Theatre was actress Valerie Harper, who, in 1970, had been signed to play Rhoda Morgenstern on the CBS-TV situation comedy The Mary Tyler Moore Show. During that show's first season, Sand was cast as Robert C. Brand, a tax auditor, who falls in love with Mary Richards (Moore) in the 11th episode "1040 or Fight". MTM Enterprises produced Friends and Lovers, in which Sand portrayed Robert Dreyfuss, a double bass player in the Boston Symphony Orchestra who falls in love easily but has little success with women. It premiered in the fall of 1974. Despite some favorable reviews and decent ratings, it was considered a disappointment and was cancelled in January 1975 after fifteen episodes had been filmed.

Sand also appeared in such motion pictures as The Hot Rock with Zero Mostel, The Second Coming of Suzanne alongside Sondra Locke, and The Main Event starring Barbra Streisand and Ryan O'Neal. 

In the fall of 1986, Sand, along with comedienne Rosie O'Donnell, joined the cast of the NBC sitcom Gimme A Break starring Nell Carter, then approaching its sixth year on prime-time television.

Filmography

Film

 A Great Big Thing (1968) - Morrie
 Viva Max! (1969) - Moreno
 The Hot Rock (1972) - Greenberg
 Every Little Crook and Nanny (1972) - Benny Napkins
 The Second Coming of Suzanne (1974) - Artist
 The Great Bank Hoax (1978) - Richard Smedley
 The Main Event (1979) - David
 Wholly Moses! (1980) - Angel Of The Lord
 Can't Stop the Music (1980) - Steve Waits
 Teen Wolf Too (1987) - Coach Finstock
 Frozen Assets (1992) - McTaggert
 Layin' Low (1996) - Augie
 Camp Stories (1997) - Moishe
 Brittle Glory (1997)
 The Volunteers (1997) - Goldberg
 Zoo (1999) - Harold Ratsess
 Chuck & Buck (2000) - Barry
 Adam & Steve (2005) - Norm
 Queer Eye For The Homeless Guy (2005, Short) - Harry the Homeless Guy
 Sweet Land (2005) - Old Frandsen
 Queen of the Lot (2010) - Ernesto / Dependency Buster
 Simple Being (2014) - Teacher

Television

 Shower of Stars (1955) - Himself - dancer (uncredited)
 That Was the Week That Was (1964)
 Mr. Broadway (1964) - Photographer
 Occasional Wife (1966) - Harvey
 Bewitched (1966) - Bill Whalen
 The Mary Tyler Moore Show (1970) - Robert C. Brand
 The Governor & J.J. (1970) - Lionel Newton
 The Carol Burnett Show (1972–1974) - Himself / Himself - Guest
 Paul Sand in Friends & Lovers (1974–1975) - Robert Dreyfuss
 Wonder Woman (1978) - Del Franklin
 Fantasy Island (1978) - Duke Manducci
 Supertrain (1979)
 Taxi (1981) - Craig Eagen
 Laverne & Shirley (1981) - David
 Gloria (1982) - Boffo the Clown
 Alice (1983) - Alan
 The Love Boat (1983) - Wally Denton
 St. Elsewhere (1983–1984) - Dr. Michael Ridley
 Domestic Life (1984) - Dr. Carl Pate
 Cagney & Lacey (1985) - Robert Wolitzer
 Murder, She Wrote (1985) - Horace Lynchfield
 Trapper John, M.D. (1985) - Philip Devonshire
 Who's the Boss? (1985–1987) - Packard / Wally
 It's a Living (1986) - Brian Phipps
 Magnum, P.I. (1986) - Denny Prine
 Gimme a Break! (1986–1987) - Marty
 The Twilight Zone (1987) - Bluestone (segment "Time and Teresa Golowitz")
 thirtysomething (1987) - Andy Aronson / Jim / Rex
 Empty Nest (1989-1991) - Avery / Poko
 Quantum Leap (1989) - Charlie
 True Colors (1990–1991) - Leonard Davis
 Baby Talk (1991) - Paul
 Night Court (1991) - Prof. Jarvis Crowley
 Eerie, Indiana (1992) - Charles Furnell / Simon Holmes
 Danger Theatre (1993) - Jimmy Jakes (segment "Move My Lips")
 L.A. Law (1994) - Headmaster Ted Waldron
 The X Files (1994) - Gird Thomas
 The Secret World of Alex Mack (1997) - Charles 'Chappy' Furnell
 Sabrina the Teenage Witch (1997) - Dr. Rafkin
 Dharma & Greg (1998) - Salazar 
 Maggie Winters (1998) - Brad
 Sliders (1999) - Dr. Malcolm White ("Map of the Mind" episode 5/12)
 E! True Hollywood Story (2001, documentary) - Himself
 Curb Your Enthusiasm (2002) - Guy Bernier
 Joan of Arcadia (2003–2005) - Rabbi Polonski

References

External links
 
 

1932 births
20th-century American male actors
21st-century American male actors
American male actors of Mexican descent
American male film actors
American male stage actors
American male television actors
Drama Desk Award winners
Living people
Los Angeles State College alumni
Male actors from Santa Monica, California
Tony Award winners